People's Democratic Front (FDR) was a short-lived united front of leftists in Indonesia, founded in February 1948. FDR included the Communist Party of Indonesia, the Socialist Party, Labour Party of Indonesia, SOBSI and Pesindo. The leader of FDR was Amir Sjarifuddin.

References

1948 establishments in Indonesia
Communist Party of Indonesia
Defunct left-wing political party alliances
Defunct political parties in Indonesia
Defunct political party alliances in Asia
Defunct socialist parties in Asia
Political parties established in 1948
Political parties with year of disestablishment missing
Political party alliances in Indonesia
Socialist parties in Indonesia
Indonesia